Michael Gerard Sullivan (born December 22, 1967) is a former American football offensive lineman and current assistant offensive line coach for the Tennessee Titans of the National Football League. He played in the National Football League for the Dallas Cowboys and Tampa Bay Buccaneers. He played college football at the University of Miami.

Early years
Sullivan attended St. Francis DeSales High School, where he was a three-year starter and was named All-Midwest as a senior. He accepted a football scholarship from the University of Miami where he was redshirted as a freshman. He played his first two years at left offensive guard, before being switched to left tackle as a junior.

He started a school record 48 consecutive games (all of the games in his college career), despite dealing with different injuries, including the removal of a benign tumor near his left ear in 1989.

Sullivan contributed to a 44-4 record, two national championships (1987, 1989), and the first 36 contests of the 58-game NCAA record home winning streak. One of two players in school history to earn an NCAA Post-Graduate Scholarship (only 15 are awarded per year) and the only two-time winner of the CBS/Toyota Leadership Award.

In 2009, he was inducted into the University of Miami Sports Hall of Fame.

Professional career

Dallas Cowboys
Sullivan was selected in the sixth round (153rd overall) by the Dallas Cowboys in the 1991 NFL Draft, with the intention of playing him at offensive guard. He originally failed his physical but was later approved to participate in training camp. 

He was waived on August 26 and later re-signed to the practice squad. After being signed to the active roster, he was released on November 22 and re-signed to the practice squad.

Tampa Bay Buccaneers
In 1992, he signed as a free agent with the Tampa Bay Buccaneers. He played four years mainly as a back-up offensive lineman and on special teams. He became a free agent on February 16, 1996.

Chicago Bears
On March 26, 1996, he was signed as a free agent by the Chicago Bears. He was released before the season started on August 28.

Coaching career
Sullivan helped four teams to championships over the span of his coaching career in the European Federation of American Football. After spending the 2000 season as a graduate assistant for the University of Miami, he joined former Hurricane coach Butch Davis's coaching staff with the Cleveland Browns. He was an offensive assistant for three-and-a-half seasons and coached tight ends for half a season in 2004. 

On January 21, 2005, he was named offensive line coach at Western Michigan University. In 2007, he was named the offensive line coach for the Browns. In 2009, he was hired as the offensive line coach of the San Diego Chargers. In 2013, he returned to the Browns as their offensive line coach. In 2014, he was hired as an assistant offensive line coach for the Tennessee Titans.

References

External links
Miami Hurricanes Hall of Fame bio
Western Michigan Broncos bio

1967 births
Living people
Sportspeople from Chicago
Players of American football from Chicago
American football offensive tackles
American football offensive guards
American football centers
Miami Hurricanes football players
Dallas Cowboys players
Tampa Bay Buccaneers players
Miami Hurricanes football coaches
Cleveland Browns coaches
Western Michigan Broncos football coaches
San Diego Chargers coaches
Tennessee Titans coaches
American people of Irish descent